Nazo is a 2015 Pakistani thriller drama television series aired on Urdu 1. Serial is produced by Fahad Mustafa and Dr. Ali Kazmi under Big Bang Entertainment.It is based on the real life of mentally challenged girl Nanu better known as Naazo. It explores the life of Nazo, a mentally challenged girl played by Sonya Hussain and her family sufferings in taking care of her which has its own set of challenges.

Cast
Sonya Hussain as Nazo
Ahmed Ali
Zhalay Sarhadi
Atiqa Odho
Rashid Farooqui
Yasra Rizvi
Beena Chaudhary as Aliya
Dabeer Naqvi
 Sami Sani (guest appearance)
 Nanu
 Hassaan Ibrahim

References

External links
 Official Website

Urdu-language television shows
Pakistani drama television series
2015 Pakistani television series debuts
Urdu 1 original programming